Naidan Namzhil (5 March 1914 – unknown) was a Mongolian chess player, Mongolian Chess Championship winner (1959).

Biography
In the 1950s Naidan Namzhil was one of Mongolian leading chess players. In 1959 he won Mongolian Chess Championship.

Naidan Namzhil played for Mongolia in the Chess Olympiads:
 In 1956, at second reserve board in the 12th Chess Olympiad in Moscow (+0, =1, -1).
 In 1960, at first board in the 14th Chess Olympiad in Leipzig (+1, =2, -9),
 In 1962, at second reserve board in the 15th Chess Olympiad in Varna (+0, =0, -1),
 In 1964, at second reserve board in the 16th Chess Olympiad in Tel Aviv (+0, =0, -1).

References

External links

Namzhil chess games at 365chess.com

Year of death missing
Mongolian chess players
Chess Olympiad competitors
20th-century chess players